Like a Dog is the sixth studio album by former Guns N' Roses guitarist Izzy Stradlin, released independently in October 2005.

Background
The tracks were recorded at Nomad Recording Studios, Carrollton, Texas in April and May 2003, but the album was not released at that time. Eventually, a fan submitted a petition of more than 1,000 signatures to release the album. As a result, Stradlin released the album on the now-defunct Scootersteez website. Later, the album was released on iTunes. As a result, Stradlin released his new albums exclusively to iTunes.

Track listing
All lyrics and music by Izzy Stradlin, except where noted.
“Bomb” - 3:42
“Hammerhead” - 2:11
“Snafu” - 1:57
“Hell Song” - 2:57
“Rollin’ On” - 2:52
“Just Don’t Know” - 4:00
“Chop Away” (Stradlin/Rick Richards) - 3:31
“Win U Lose” - 2:45
“On the Run” - 4:23
“Like a Dog” - 3:20
Hidden track - 3:30

Personnel
Izzy Stradlin – lead vocals, rhythm guitar, producer
Rick Richards – lead guitar
JT Longoria – bass guitar
Taz Bentley – drums

References

Izzy Stradlin albums
2005 albums